Extra Service is a 2017 Filipino action-comedy film starring Arci Muñoz, Jessy Mendiola and Coleen Garcia. The film was directed by Chris Martinez and produced by Skylight Films and Star Cinema.

The film marks the reunion of Arci and Coleen who were among the lead stars of Pasion de Amor, a Filipino version of Pasión de Gavilanes, aired on ABS-CBN.

The film also marks Enzo Pineda and Vin Abrenica's first Star Cinema movie upon their transfer to ABS-CBN.

The last film of Skylight Films before it ended its operations and the subsequent creation of Black Sheep Productions in 2018.

Synopsis
The story revolves around the amazing adventures of Aw (Arci Muñoz), Em (Coleen Garcia) and Gee (Jessy Mendiola), who are mild-mannered massage therapists by day and fierce secret agents who solve crimes by night. They are then tasked to embark on a top-level secret mission to retrieve the precious “Perlas Ng Silangan” in exchange for their lives and freedom.

Cast

Main

 Arci Muñoz as Aurora/Kapitana/Aw
 Coleen Garcia as Emerald/Maldita/Em
 Jessy Mendiola as Genevieve/Henya/Gee

Supporting
 Ejay Falcon as Moises
 Enzo Pineda as Larry
 Vin Abrenica as Carlo
 Jaime Fabregas as Don Jose Mondragon
 Arlene Muhlach as Doña Akira Susomo
 Carmi Martin as L
 Janus del Prado as Paquito Mondragon
 Kim Molina as Mari Susomo
 Kitkat as Beverly
 Tessie Tomas as Lolly
 Michelle Vito as Julia
 Elisse Joson as Julia
 Alexa Ilacad as Julia

References

External links
 

Films directed by Chris Martinez